Budaörsi SC is a Hungarian football team founded in 1924 and based in Budaörs, a town near Budapest.

Non playing staff
 György Bognár

Managers
 György Bognár

Current squad
.

References

External links
 Official site

 
Football clubs in Hungary
Association football clubs established in 1924
1924 establishments in Hungary
Sport in Pest County